Perchoerus is an extinct genus of suine from the Eocene and Oligocene of North America. Three species are known. While often considered to be a peccary, other studies have recovered it to be a basal suine outside of either peccaries or Suidae. The oldest known species of Perchoerus is P. minor, which was only the size of a house cat. It is known from skull and tooth material.
The later P. nanus of the Orellan grew larger and is known from a skull and lower jaw. The latest and largest species was P. probus of the Oligocene (32-30 mya). It was much larger (about as big as living peccaries) and known from more remains than the other species.

References

Prehistoric even-toed ungulate genera
Peccaries
Prehistoric mammals of North America
Eocene mammals of North America
Oligocene mammals of North America
Prehistoric mammal genera